The Council of Ministers (Dzongkha: ལྷན་རྒྱས་གཞུང་ཚོགས་; Wylie: lhan-rgyas gzhung-tshogs) is the highest executive body in Bhutan. It was created in 1999 by Jigme Singye Wangchuck, the fourth King of Bhutan.

History of the Lhengye Zhungtshog
Until 1999, Bhutan's Cabinet consisted of a council of Ministers chaired by King Jigme Singye Wangchuck. In 1999, as a major step toward democratization, the King dissolved the existing cabinet and withdrew from his role in the decision-making in the cabinet. Six new ministers were nominated,  placed before the National Assembly, and voted in as new ministers. The term Council of Cabinet Ministers, or "CCM," was thus born. From this group of six ministers, a chairman was selected. The selection was based on the number of "yes" votes received during the National Assembly vote. The role of Chairman rotated among members, each minister enjoying the honour for a period of one year.

On July 26, 1999, the National Assembly enacted the Lhengye Zhungtsho Act on advice of the King. This represents the first codification of the modern Lhengye Zhungtshog. Under the act, executive power is fully devolved to the new Lhengye Zhungtshog. Initially, the body lacked a Prime Minister, but was headed by a Chair; later, this position was eliminated in favor of the office of Prime Minister. The Lhengye Zhungtshog was also composed differently from in later years: it consisted of elected Ministers, members of the Royal Advisory Council and the Kalyon. Elected Ministers must have been natural born citizens of Bhutan, must not have been married to a foreign national, and must have already held senior government posts at the rank of Secretary to the Royal Government or above. Candidates were nominated by the King and elected indirectly through the National Assembly. Under the first incarnation of the Lhengye Zhungtshog, as under the "CCM," Ministers continued to enjoy five-year terms while the Chair rotated among them on a yearly basis.

Modern Lhengye Zhungtshog
Under Article 20 of the Constitution of Bhutan, executive power is vested in the Lhengye Zhungtshog, consisting of the Ministers headed by the prime minister. The number of Ministers is determined by the number of Ministries required to provide efficient and good governance. Creation of an additional ministry or reduction of any ministry must be approved by Parliament. The Lhengye Zhungtshog must aid and advise the King in the exercise of His functions including international affairs, provided that the King may require the Lhengye Zhungtshog to reconsider such advice. The Prime Minister must keep the King informed from time to time about the affairs of the State, including international affairs, and must submit such information and files as called for by the King.

The Lhengye Zhungtshog must assess the state of affairs arising from developments in the State and society and from events at home and abroad; define the goals of State action and determine the resources required to achieve them; plan and co-ordinate government policies and ensure their implementation; and represent the Kingdom at home and abroad. The Lhengye Zhungtshog are collectively responsible to the King and to Parliament. The Executive cannot issue any executive order, circular, rule or notification inconsistent with, modifying, varying or superseding the laws of Bhutan.

Presently, the council has 10 members who are termed as Lyonpos and wear a ceremonial orange scarf. The prime minister, who is the head of the government, is directly elected by the people through two rounds of national elections every five years. Democratic elections were first held in 2008. The latest elections were held in 2018. The present prime minister of Bhutan is Lyonchen Dr. Lotay Tshering who will be serving for a term of five years.

(MoAF)  
Department of Agriculture  
Department of Forests and Park Services 
Department of Livestock
Department of Agricultural Marketing and Cooperatives
Bhutan Agriculture and Food Regulatory Authority 
National Biodiversity Center
 Rural Development Training Centre

State Owned Enterprises (SOEs) affiliated to MoAF are:
Green Bhutan Corporation Limited
Farm Machinery Corporation Limited
Bhutan Livestock Development Corporation Limited
   
Previous Ministers:

The Ministry of Economic Affairs is responsible for:
Department of Trade
Department of Industry
Department of Intellectual Property
Department of Geology and Mines
Department of Hydro-Met Services
Department of Renewable Energy
Department of Hydropower & Power Systems
Department of Cottage & Small Industry 
Office of Consumer Protection
Previous Ministers:

The Ministry of Education is responsible for:
Department of Adult and Higher Education  
Department of School Education  
Department of Youth, Culture and Sports

Previous Ministers:

The Ministry of Finance is responsible for:
Department of Aid and Debt Management  
Department of National Budget  
Department of National Properties  
Department of Public Accounts  
Department of Revenue and Customs  
Department of Macro Economics 
Previous ministers:
Lyonpo Chogyal (May 1968 – 1988)
Lyonpo Dorji Tshering (1988 – 1998)
Lyonpo Yeshey Zimba (August 1998 – July 2003)
Lyonpo Wangdi Norbu (July 2003 – July 2007) (April 2008 – May 2013)

The Ministry of Foreign Affairs is responsible for:
Department of Bilateral Affairs  
Department of Multilateral Affairs  
Department of Protocol  
Previous Ministers:

The Ministry of Health is responsible for: 
Department of Public Health  
Department of Public Services  
Department of Medical Supplies and Health Infrastructures
Department of Traditional Medicine
Directorate of Services

Previous Ministers:

The Ministry of Home and Cultural Affairs is responsible for: 
Bureau of Law and Order  
Department of Civil Registration and Census  
Department of Culture and Heritage  
Department of Immigration  
Department of Local Governance  
  
Previous ministers:
Lyonpo Tamji Jagar (1968 – 1985) 
HRH Namgyal Wangchuk (1985 – 1991) 
Lyonpo Dago Tshering  (1991 – June 1998) 
Lyonpo Thinley Gyamtsho (July 1998 – August 2003) 
Lyonpo Jigmi Y. Thinley (August 2003 – July 2007)

The Ministry of Information and Communication is responsible for: 
Bhutan Infocomm and Media Authority  
Department of Civil Aviation  
Department of Information and Media  
Department of Information Technology  
Road Safety and Transport Authority
Bhutan Broadcasting Service
Bhutan Post
Bhutan Telecom  
Druk Air
Kuensel Corporation  
Previous Ministers:

The Ministry of Labour and Human Resources is responsible for: 
Department of Employment  
Department of Human Resources  
Department of Labour  
Department of Occupational Standards  
Previous Ministers:

The Ministry of Works and Human Settlement is responsible for:
Department of Roads  
Department of Urban Development & Engineering Serv  
Department of Urban Development and Eng. Services  
Standard and Quality Control Authority  
Previous Ministers:
Lyonpo Ugyen Tshering
Lyonpo Kinzang Dorji

Former cabinets

Tshering Tobay's cabinet

Current cabinet

See also
List of prime ministers of Bhutan
Politics of Bhutan
Constitution of Bhutan
Bhutanese legislation

Notes

External links
The Royal Government of Bhutan
The 4th King's 2006 address of the Lhengye Zhungtsho - His Majesty's vision of the future of Bhutan
Ministry of Agriculture
Ministry of Economic Affairs
Ministry of Education
Ministry of Finance
Ministry of Foreign Affairs
Ministry of Health
Ministry of Home and Cultural Affairs
Ministry Information and Communications
Ministry of Labour and Human Resources
Ministry of Works and Human Settlement
 Constitution of the Kingdom of Bhutan (English)

 
Bhutan